Mitic may refer to:

 Mitić, Serbian surname
 Mitic, Jalisco, Mexican village